Vladimir Yevgenievich Soltan (9 January 1953 – 1 June 1997) was a Belarusian composer. He was born in Baranovichi. He graduated from the Minsk Conservatory in 1979, and as post graduate in 1981 from the composition class of Anatoly Bogatyrev. He died in Minsk.

Works
 opera - Lady Jadwiga «Пани Ядвига»
 The wild hunt of king Stah(1989)
 film music for Yurka son of the commander.
 Symphonic Overture (1974), 
 Variations (1976)
 Symphony: I (1979)
 Symphony No.2 "In memory of the Minsk Underground" (1983)
 "Thoughts and feelings" for string orchestra, oboe, flute and French horn (1977) 
 Nocturne (1974), for strings, vibraphone and oboe
 Lyrical Cantata (to the words of Y. Kolasa, 1978) for voice, mixed choir and chamber orchestra
 Two songs on words by A. Tarkovsky 1977
 Five songs (1981)
 Cycle of songs  (1986)

Recordings
 Symphony No 2. Symphonic Poem. Melody and Chorale for cello & piano. Concerto for cello 1992

References

Russian classical composers
Russian male classical composers
1953 births
1997 deaths
20th-century classical composers
Belarusian composers
20th-century Russian male musicians